The Apostolic Administration of Kyrgyzstan is a Roman Catholic (Latin Church) Apostolic Administration (pre-diocesan jurisdiction; originally an Independent Mission) for the Catholics of Kyrgyzstan (West Turkistan, Central Asia).

It is exempt, i.e. directly subject to the Holy See (not part of any ecclesiastical province) and entitled to a titular bishop, but has no (pro-)cathedral see yet.

History 
On 22 December 1997, the Holy See established the Mission sui iuris of Kyrguzstan on territory split off from the then Apostolic Administration of Kazakhstan (shortly after promoted to Diocese of Karaganda, after missiones sui iuris were also split off for Tajikistan, Turkmenistan and Uzbekistan, all in 1997).

On 18 March 2006, the independent mission was promoted as Apostolic Administration.

Ordinaries 

 Ecclesiastical superior of the Mission sui iuris 
 Father Aleksandr Kan, S.J. (1997.12.22 – 2006.03.18)

 Apostolic Administrators
 Nikolaus Messmer, S.J., titular bishop of Carmeiano (2006.03.18 – 2016.07.18)
 Janez Mihelčič, S.J. (2016.08.01 – 2017.08.29)
 Anthony James Corcoran, S.J. (since 2017.08.29)

References

External links
 Catholic Church of Kyrgyzstan
 GigaCatholic

Apostolic administrations
Catholic Church in Kyrgyzstan